Cobalt lactate is a chemical compound, a salt of cobalt and lactic acid with the formula Co(C3H5O3)2.

Synthesis
Cobalt lactate can be formed by boiling hydrated oxide of cobalt with lactic acid.

Physical properties
Cobalt lactate forms peach-blossom red salt. It is soluble in water.

When heated, the compound becomes black, takes fire, and leaves cobalt oxide.

Use
Cobalt lactate is used as a ruminal source of cobalt in a high-forage total mixed ration fed to late-lactation dairy cows.

References

Lactates
Cobalt compounds